Mohamed Ben Joullon (born 23 September 1925) is a Moroccan épée, foil and sabre fencer. He competed in five events at the 1960 Summer Olympics.

References

External links
 

1925 births
Possibly living people
Moroccan male épée fencers
Olympic fencers of Morocco
Fencers at the 1960 Summer Olympics
Sportspeople from Casablanca
Moroccan male sabre fencers
Moroccan male foil fencers